Fit To Hit: Philippine Beach Volleyball Invitational is the inaugural tournament of Fit To Hit, a beach volleyball league organized by Sports Vision Management Group, Inc. (organizer of the Shakey's V-League and Spikers' Turf indoor volleyball leagues) and Solar Sports.

The Invitational is an international tournament held on September 25–27, 2015 at The Sands, SM By the Bay of the SM Mall of Asia Complex, Pasay. It was televised on the Solar Sports channel on a delayed basis.

After the Invitational, Fit To Hit will stage beach volleyball circuit legs in different cities across the Philippines, as part of the development program for the beach volleyball.

Tournament format
The eight teams will participate in the tournament, will be divided into two four-team groups. The teams will first undergo a single round robin preliminary round, while 4 teams will moved over to the semifinals. The two teams that will win in the semifinals, will advance to the finals. Classification matches will also be played for the 6 remaining teams.

Teams
The tournament is among teams from Hong Kong, Malaysia, New Zealand and the Philippines. Teams from China, Hong Kong, Singapore, Indonesia and Vietnam backed out of the competition because LVPI withdrew its support.

Final ranking
Total amount of prizes that will given away to the eight teams, to be divided based on their placings: $19,000 Dollars

See also
Solar Sports

References

External links
YouTube teaser

Solar Entertainment Corporation
Shakey's V-League
Beach volleyball competitions in the Philippines
2015 in beach volleyball
2015 in Philippine sport
Sport in Pasay